The Baojun RS-5 is a 5-seater compact crossover SUV produced by Baojun.

Overview 

The Baojun RS-5 was previously code named the CN210S and is positioned above the compact 530 crossover within Baojun's lineup. The car uses a new platform which has never been used before in Baojun vehicles. It is the first Baojun vehicle to be offered in alpha-numeric nomenclature, and is the first product of the 'New Baojun' sub-category and features the Interstellar Geometry design language of the brand. The RS-5 was launched at the 2018 Guangzhou Auto Show in December and the adoption of Baojun’s updated diamond-shaped logo debuted on the RS-5 when the production version was launched in April 2019.

As for safety equipments, the Baojun RS-5 is equipped with ESP, ABS + EBD, VDC(vehicle dynamic control system), TCS (Traction Control System), HBA (brake assist system), HHC (Uphill Assist System), Electronics Parking Brake, Autohold, Tire Pressure Monitoring, ACC(Adaptive Cruise Control), LKA (Lane Keeping Assist), Lane Departure Warning System, Speed Limit Sign Warning, intelligent far and near light switch, emergency brake, and a 360 degree panoramic camera.

References 

RS-5
Cars introduced in 2018
Cars of China
Crossover sport utility vehicles
Compact sport utility vehicles
Vehicles with CVT transmission